Swin may refer to:

 Swin (Thames), a passage in the Thames estuary
 Swin Bridge, a skew arch bridge in County Durham
 Swin River, a river of the Canterbury, New Zealand

People
 Swin Cash (born 1979), American basketball player
 Swin Hadley (1904–1970), New Zealand rugby union player
 Henry Jackson (football manager) (born c. 1850), English football manager nicknamed Swin
 Charlie Swindells (1878–1940), American baseball player nicknamed Swin

See also
 Swine (disambiguation)
 Swim (disambiguation)